Balep is a Tibetan bannock quickbread. There are also other types of Tibetan cuisine "balep" breads and fried pies including:

 Amdo Balep a rounded bread from the Amdo region.
 Sha balep are fried beef pies
 Numtrak balep is deep fried bread
 Balep korkun a pan-cooked bread
 Shamey balep are fried pies

See also
 List of Tibetan dishes

References

Tibetan cuisine